Salvatore Vincent Pizzo is an American scientist, currently Distinguished Professor of Pathology at Duke University Medical Center and an Elected Fellow of the American Association for the Advancement of Science.

References

Year of birth missing (living people)
Living people
Fellows of the American Association for the Advancement of Science
21st-century American biologists
Duke University faculty
American pathologists
Place of birth missing (living people)